During the 1992–93 English football season, Notts County F.C. competed in the Football League First Division.

Season summary
In the 1992–93 season, Notts County's push for a return to the top flight after relegation the previous season started disappointingly and on 14 January, Warnock was sacked after four years at the club and was replaced by Mick Walker who guided the club to safety to prevent back to back relegations and hope for promotion push next time round.

Final league table

Results
Notts County's score comes first

Legend

Football League First Division

FA Cup

League Cup

Anglo-Italian Cup

Squad

References

Notts County F.C. seasons
Notts County